Faurelina is a genus of fungi in the family Chadefaudiellaceae.

Species
As accepted by Species Fungorum;
 Faurelina elongata 
 Faurelina fimigena 
 Faurelina hispanica 
 Faurelina indica

References

Microascales